Randy White  (born September 3, 1948 in Halifax, Nova Scotia) is a Canadian accountant and former politician. White was first elected to the House of Commons of Canada as the Reform Party Member of Parliament (MP) for
Fraser Valley West, British Columbia in the 1993 federal election.

In the 1997 election, he was re-elected for the riding of Langley—Abbotsford, and became a Canadian Alliance MP in 2000 when Reform was joined by dissident members of the Progressive Conservative Party of Canada.

White served as the Reform Party's House Leader from 1997 to 2000 and as the Canadian Alliance House Leader from 2001 to 2002. He also served as Caucus Chair in 2001, and as Deputy Caucus Chair in 2002. He joined the new Conservative Party of Canada upon the merger of the Alliance with the Progressive Conservative Party in early 2004.

In 2004, Randy White famously was quoted saying "to heck with the courts" in regard to overturning same-sex marriage. Bruce Cheadle of the Canadian Press said that this comment "may have cost the Conservatives the election".

White left politics in 2006 and did not run in the 2006 federal election. He has continued activity in the area of drug policy, including founding The Drug Prevention Network of Canada.

In 2010, the British Columbia Conservative Party announced that White had joined the party and would chair its tactical advisory group.

White is a former member of the Royal Canadian Air Force.

References

External links

1948 births
Canadian Alliance MPs
Conservative Party of Canada MPs
Living people
Members of the House of Commons of Canada from British Columbia
People from Halifax, Nova Scotia
Reform Party of Canada MPs
21st-century Canadian politicians